The 1924 New Year Honours in New Zealand were appointments as Knight Bachelor by King George V, on the advice of the New Zealand government, to reward and highlight good works by two New Zealanders. The awards celebrated the passing of 1923 and the beginning of 1924, and were announced on 1 January 1924.

The recipients of honours are displayed here as they were styled before their new honour.

Knight Bachelor
 Henry Lindo Ferguson   – of Dunedin; dean of the Faculty of Medicine, University of Otago.
 The Honourable Arthur Mielziner Myers – of Auckland; formerly minister of customs and munitions and for many years member of the House of Representatives. In recognition of his public services.

References

New Year Honours
1924 awards
1924 in New Zealand
New Zealand awards